Vereshchovka is a rural locality (a station) in Dyatkovsky District, Bryansk Oblast, Russia. The population was 18 as of 2010. There are 5 streets.

Geography 
Vereshchovka is located 9 km north of Dyatkovo (the district's administrative centre) by road. Psursky Khutor is the nearest rural locality.

References 

Rural localities in Dyatkovsky District